Dr. Jean-Louis Sebagh is an Algerian-born French cosmetic surgeon|doctor, known for his anti-aging surgeries, and use of botox, specifically on the face and neck.

Life and career
Born in Algeria, Sebagh obtained a medical degree from the University of Paris and then learned plastic surgery in Los Angeles. For around 15 years, he worked to rebuild cancer victims' faces and heal burns victims' scarring in Paris's Hôpital Foch. 

In 1997, he divorced his wife, a Parisian dentist. He has a son and a daughter.

Sebagh has a line of skin care products called Dr. Sebagh Anti-Aging marketed by Californian-based direct sales company Guthy-Renker and promoted through TV infomercials.

References

External links
Official website

Living people
French plastic surgeons
Year of birth missing (living people)